Talisheek is an unincorporated community in St. Tammany Parish, Louisiana, United States. Talisheek has a post office with ZIP code 70464.

Etymology
The name is derived from the word talushik which means rock, gravel or pebble in the Choctaw language.

References

Unincorporated communities in St. Tammany Parish, Louisiana
Unincorporated communities in Louisiana
Unincorporated communities in New Orleans metropolitan area